Cilly can refer to:

an alternative spelling of Celje, the third largest city in Slovenia
Cilly, Aisne, a commune of the Aisne département in northern France
Cilly Aussem (1909–1963), German female tennis player